Yllana Brosseau (born 5 September 2000) is a French rugby union player. She plays for the France women's national rugby union team as a prop forward.

Career
Brosseau joined Stade Bordelais in 2021 from AC Bobigny 93 Rugby although agreed to move back to Bobigny in 2022.

She was named in France's team for the delayed 2021 Rugby World Cup in New Zealand.

References

2000 births
Living people
French female rugby union players